Pedro Henrique Brasil Cardona (born August 15, 1995 in São Paulo) is a Brazilian swimmer.

References

Living people
Brazilian male breaststroke swimmers
1995 births
Swimmers from São Paulo
Universiade medalists in swimming
Universiade bronze medalists for Brazil
Medalists at the 2019 Summer Universiade